The battle of Guelta Zemmur (or Gueltat Zemmur or Guelta Zemmour) may refer to :
 Battle of Guelta Zemmur (1989)
 Battle of Guelta Zemmur (October 1981)